Kang Youwei (Cantonese: Hōng Yáuh-wàih; 19March 185831March 1927) was a prominent political thinker and reformer in China of the late Qing dynasty. His increasing closeness to and influence over the young Guangxu Emperor sparked conflict between the emperor and his adoptive mother, the regent Empress Dowager Cixi.  His ideas were influential in the abortive Hundred Days' Reform. Following the coup by Cixi that ended the reform, Kang was forced to flee. He continued to advocate for a Chinese constitutional monarchy after the founding of the Republic of China.

Early life

Kang was born on 19March 1858 in Su Village, Danzao Town, Nanhai County, Guangdong province (now the Nanhai District of Foshan City). According to his autobiography, his intellectual gifts were recognized in his childhood by his uncle. As a result, from an early age, he was sent by his family to study the Confucian classics to pass the Chinese civil service exams. However, as a teenager, he was dissatisfied with the scholastic system of his time, especially its emphasis on preparing for the eight-legged essays, which were artificial literary exercises required as part of the examinations.

Studying for exams was an extraordinarily rigorous activity so he engaged in Buddhist meditation as a form of relaxation, an unusual leisurely activity for a Chinese scholar of his time. It was during one of these meditations that he had a mystical vision that became the theme for his intellectual pursuits throughout his life. Believing that it was possible to read every book and "become a sage", he embarked on a quasi-messianic pursuit to save humanity.

Biography

Kang called for an end to property and the family in the interest of an idealized future cosmopolitan utopia and cited Confucius as an example of a reformer and not as a reactionary, as many of his contemporaries did. The latter idea was discussed in great detail in his work A Study of Confucius as a Reformer of Institutions. He argued, to bolster his claims that the rediscovered versions of the Confucian classics were forged, as he treated in detail in A Study of the Forged Classics of the Xin Period.

In 1879, Kang traveled to Hong Kong and he was shocked by the prosperity there, which started his interest in Western culture and thoughts. In 1882, Kang went to Beijing to take the imperial examination. When he was returning home, he stopped over in Shanghai and bought many Western books there, and started developing his ideology based on these writings. He was influenced by Protestant Christianity in his quest for reform.

In 1883, Kang founded the Anti-Footbinding Society near Canton.

Kang Youwei launched the Society for the Study of National Strengthening (Qiangxue hui) in Beijing. It is the first political group established by reformists in China. Through it, Kang became acquainted with Governor-General Zhang Zhidong and received his financial support to inaugurate the Paper of the Society for the Study of the National Strengthening (Qiangxue bao) in January 1896. In the same month, the society was dissolved and the paper had to cease publication.

Kang was a strong believer in constitutional monarchy and wanted to remodel the country after Meiji Japan. These ideas angered his colleagues in the scholarly class who regarded him as a heretic.

In 1895, China was defeated by Japan in the First Sino-Japanese War. To protest against Treaty of Shimonoseki, Kang Youwei, Liang Qichao and over 600 civil examination candidates signed a petition to the Guangxu Emperor, known to history as Gongche Shangshu movement. This movement is taken as the sign of the appearance of reformists and the start of Chinese mass political movements.

Kang and his noted student, Liang Qichao, were important participants in a campaign to modernize China now known as the Hundred Days' Reform. The reforms introduced radical change into the Chinese government. Empress Dowager Cixi staged a coup that put an end to the reforms, put the Guangxu Emperor under house arrest, and ordered Kang's arrest and execution on the basis that he had tried to have her assassinated. Kang fled the country but also organized the Protect the Emperor Society which promoted the cause of the Guangxu Emperor, mainly in Chinese diaspora communities, and advocated the removal of Cixi. Kang relied on his principal American military advisor, General Homer Lea to head the military branch of the Protect the Emperor Society. Kang traveled throughout the world to promote his ideas. He competed with the revolutionary leader Sun Yat-sen's Revive China Society and Revolutionary Alliance for funds and followers among overseas Chinese.

Kang visited India twice, first in 1901–1903 and then again in October 1909, in part to study India, which he regarded as comparable to China. Although his information about Indian history was derived from English authors, he observed that India's plight as a
colonised country was due to the disunity among the different regions of India.

The Xinhai Revolution led to the abdication of the Qing dynasty and the establishment of a Republic under Sun Yat-sen in 1912.

Some advocated that a Han be installed as Emperor, either the descendant of Confucius, who was the Duke Yansheng, which Kang briefly endorsed before dropping the idea and returning to the idea of a Qing monarch, or the Ming dynasty Imperial family descendant, the Marquis of Extended Grace.

Kang remained an advocate of constitutional monarchy and launched a failed coup d'état in 1917. General Zhang Xun and his queue-wearing soldiers occupied Beijing, declaring a restoration of Emperor Puyi on July1.

The incident was a major miscalculation. The nation was highly anti-monarchist. Kang became suspicious of Zhang's insincere constitutionalism and feared he was merely using the restoration to become the power behind the throne. He abandoned his mission and fled to the American legation. On July 12, Duan Qirui easily occupied the city.

Kang's reputation serves as an important barometer for the political attitudes of his time. In the span of less than twenty years, he went from being regarded as an iconoclastic radical to an anachronistic pariah.

Chinese-British biographer Jung Chang gave Kang Youwei unfavorable criticism due to his role in spreading numerous vilifying stories about the Empress Dowager. Among those stories including accusation Cixi of murdering Empress Dowager Ci'an, driving her own son to death, and massively appropriating naval funds. Chang asserted that Kang Youwei was a "master propagandist" who also harbored an intention to become an emperor by claiming as the reincarnation of  Confucius, although he later abandoned that plan.

Datong Shu

Kang's best-known and probably most controversial work is Datong Shu (大同書). The title of the book derives from the name of a utopian society imagined by Confucius, but it literally means "The Book of Great Unity". The ideas of this book appeared in his lecture notes from 1884. Encouraged by his students, he worked on this book for the next two decades, but it was not until his exile in India that he finished the first draft. The first two chapters of the book were published in Japan in the 1900s, but the book was not published in its entirety until 1935, about seven years after his death.

Kang proposed a utopian future world free of political boundaries and democratically ruled by one central government. In his scheme, the world would be split into rectangular administrative districts, which would be self-governing under a direct democracy but loyal to a central world government. There would also be the dissolution of racial boundaries. Kang outlines an immensely ambitious eugenics program that would eliminate the "brown and black" racial phenotype after a millennium and lead to the emergence of a fair-skinned homogeneous human race whose members would "be the same color, the same appearance, the same size, and the same intelligence".

His desire to end the traditional Chinese family structure defines him as an early advocate of women's independence in China.  
He reasoned that the institution of the family practiced by society since the beginning of time was a great cause of strife. Kang hoped it would be effectively abolished.

The family would be replaced by state-run institutions, such as womb-teaching institutions, nurseries and schools. Marriage would be replaced by one-year contracts between a woman and a man. Kang considered the contemporary form of marriage, in which a woman was trapped for a lifetime, to be too oppressive. Kang believed in equality between men and women and that there should be no social barrier barring women from doing whatever men can do. 

Kang saw capitalism as an inherently evil system. He believed that government should establish socialist institutions to overlook the welfare of each individual. At one point, he even advocated that government should adopt the methods of "communism" although it is debated what Kang meant by this term.

In this spirit, in addition to establishing government nurseries and schools to replace the institution of the family, he also envisioned government-run retirement homes for the elderly. It is debated whether Kang's socialist ideas were inspired more by Western thought or by traditional Confucian ideals.

Lawrence G. Thompsom believes that his socialism was based on traditional Chinese ideals. His work is permeated with the Confucian ideal of ren (仁), or humanity. However, Thompson also noted a reference by Kang to Fourier. Thus, some Chinese scholars believe that Kang's socialist ideals were influenced by Western intellectuals after his exile in 1898.

Notable in Kang's Da Tong Shu were his enthusiasm for and his belief in bettering humanity through technology, unusual for a Confucian scholar during his time. He believed that Western technological progress had a central role in saving humanity. While many scholars of his time continued to maintain the belief that Western technology should be adopted only to defend China against the West, he seemed to whole-heartedly embrace the modern idea that technology is integral for advancing mankind. Before anything of modern scale had been built, he foresaw a global telegraphic and telephone network. He also believed that as a result of technological advances, each individual would only need to work three or four hours per day, a prediction that would be repeated by the most optimistic futurists later in the 20th century.

When the book was first published, it was received with mixed reactions. Kang's support for the Guangxu Emperor was seen as reactionary by many Chinese intellectuals, who believed that Kang's book was an elaborate joke and that he was merely acting as an apologist for the emperor as to how a utopian paradise could have developed if the Qing dynasty had been maintained. Others believe that Kang was a bold and daring protocommunist, who advocated modern Western socialism and communism. Amongst the latter was Mao Zedong, who admired Kang Youwei and his socialist ideals in the Da Tongshu.

Modern Chinese scholars now often take the view that Kang was an important advocate of Chinese socialism. Despite the controversy, Da Tongshu still remains popular. A Beijing publisher included it on the list of 100 most influential books in Chinese history.

Philosophical views

Kang enumerated sources of human suffering in a way similar to that of Buddhism.

The sufferings associated with man's physical life are being implanted in the womb, premature death, loss of a limb, being a barbarian, living outside China, being a slave and being a woman. The sufferings associated with natural disasters are famine resulting from flood or drought, epidemic, conflagration, flood, volcanic eruptions, collapse of buildings, shipwreck and locust plagues. The sufferings associated with the human relationship are being a widow, being orphaned or childless, being ill with no one to provide medical care, suffering poverty and having a low and mean station in life.  The sufferings associated with society are corporal punishment and imprisonment, taxation, military conscription, social stratification, oppressive political institutions, the existence of the state and the existence of the family. The human feelings which cause suffering are stupidity, hatred, fatigue, lust, attachment to things and desire. The things that cause suffering because of the esteem in which they are held are wealth, eminent position, longevity, being a ruler and being a spiritual leader. He also visualised a hierarchy of various religions, in which Christianity and Islam were considered the lowest, above them being Confucianism, Taoism and Buddhism. He predicted that the lower religions would eventually disappear in the future.

Calligraphy 

Kang Youwei was an accomplished calligrapher, responsible for the creation of Kang Typeface (Bad Model, Chinese: 破体). He commended tablet calligraphy and depreciated model calligraphy. In his early years, he learned from Ouyang Xun by imitation. In his work Guang yizhoushuangji (广艺舟双楫), he did comprehensive and systematic research and introduction about tablet calligraphy. In Kang’s later years, selling calligraphy became his most reliable source of income.

Kang Youwei Island 

After the failure of the Hundred Days’ Reform, Kang Youwei fled China. In 1898, he arrived in Japan via Hong Kong. Kang reached Sweden in 1904 and was deeply attracted to the landscape. He bought an islet off Saltsjöbaden and built a Chinese style garden and building named "Beihai Caotang" (Chinese: 北海草堂). This island is still known as Kang Youwei Island by many Chinese.

Death
Kang died at his home in the city of Qingdao, Shandong in 1927. He was 69.

References

Further reading
M. E. Cameron, The Reform Movement in China, 1898–1912 (1931, repr. 1963); biography ed. and tr. by Lo Jung-pang (1967).
Chang Hao, Chinese Intellectuals in Crisis. Search for Order and Meaning (1890–1911), Berkeley 1987.
Chang Hao: "Intellectual change and the reform movement, 1890-1898", in: Twitchett, Denis and Fairbanks, John (ed.): The Cambridge History of China:  Vol. 11, Late Ch’ing, 1800–1911, Part 2 (1980). Cambridge: Cambridge University Press, pp. 274–338, esp. 283-300, 318-338.
 Howard, Richard C., "K’ang Yu-wei (1858-1927): His Intellectual Background and Early Thought", in A.F. Wright and Denis Twitchett (eds.): Confucian Personalities. Stanford: Stanford University Press, 1962, pp. 294–316 and 382-386 (notes).
 Hsiao, Kung-Chuan: A Modern China and a New World – K`ang Yu-wei, Reformer and Utopian, 1858-1927 (1975). Seattle and London: University of Washington Press.
 Jung-Pan, Lo. ed.  K'ang Yu-wei; a biography and a symposium (1967) online
 Karl, Rebecca And Zarrow, Peter (ed.): Rethinking the 1898 Reform Period – Political and Cultural Change in Late Qing China (2002). Cambridge/Mass.: Harvard University Press, esp. pp. 24–33.
 K'ang Yu-wei. A Biography and a Symposium, ed. Lo Jung-pang, Tucson 1967 (The Association for Asian Studies: Monographs and Papers, Bd. 23).
 Spence, Jonathan D. The gate of heavenly peace: the Chinese and their revolution. (Penguin, 1982). pp 1-106 online
 Palmer, Norman D. "Makers Of Modern China: I. The Reformer: Kang Yu-wei" Current History 15#84 (Aug 1, 1948): 88+. online
 Teng, Ssu-Yü, and Fairbank, John K.: China's response to the West – a documentary survey 1839-1923 (1954, 1979). Cambridge: Harvard University Press, pp. 147–163 (online
 Thompson, Laurence G.: Ta t´ung shu: the one-world philosophy of K`ang Yu-wei (1958). London: George Allen and Unwin, esp. pp. 37–57.
 Wong, Young-Tsu. "Revisionism reconsidered: Kang Youwei and the reform movement of 1898." Journal of Asian Studies 51.3 (1992): 513-544. online. 
 Zarrow, Peter. China in war and revolution, 1895-1949 (New York: Routledge), 2005, 12-29. online

In other languages
Chi Wen-shun, K'ang Yu-wei (1858–1927) (in Die Söhne des Drachen. Chinas Weg vom Konfuzianismus zum Kommunismus, ed. P. J. Opitz, Mchn. 1974, S. 83–109). 
 Franke, W. Die staatspolitischen Reformversuche K'ang Yu-weis u. seiner Schule. Ein Beitrag zur geistigen Auseinandersetzung Chinas mit dem Abendlande (in Mitt. des Seminars für Orientalische Sprachen, Bln. 38, 1935, Nr. 1, S. 1–83).
Kuang Bailin, Kang Youwei di zhexue sixiang, Peking 1980.
G. Sattler-v. Sivers, Die Reformbewegung von 1898 (in Chinas große Wandlung. Revolutionäre Bewegungen im 19. u. 20. Jh., ed. P. J. Opitz, Mchn. 1972, S. 55–81).
Tang Zhijun, Kang Youwei yu wuxu bianfa, Peking 1984. – Ders., Wuxu bianfa shi, Peking 1984.
Wuxu weixin yundong shi lunji, ed. Hu Shengwu, Changsha 1983.

External links

Infoplease.com Profile
K'ang Yu-wei on Encyclopedia.com
 On the Ostensible Sources of Mao Zedong's Utopia: Kang Youwei & Saneatsu Mushanokoji

See also

Gongche Shangshu movement
 Lawrence M. Kaplan. Homer Lea: American Soldier of Fortune. University Press of Kentucky, 2010. .

1858 births
1927 deaths
Chinese anti-capitalists
Chinese Confucianists
Chinese eugenicists
Chinese monarchists
Chinese scholars
Chinese socialists
Qing dynasty calligraphers
Qing dynasty politicians from Guangdong
People from Nanhai District
Philosophers from Guangdong
Politicians from Foshan
Writers from Foshan
Chinese reformers